Anthony Saul Basile Delgado (born September 23, 1980) is a professional football forward who currently plays for Atlético Nacional.

Club career
Basile has played in the Uruguayan and Colombian second divisions and played alongside compatriot Román Torres at Colombian side Cortuluá in January 2006.

In January 2012 he joined Salvadoran side Once Municipal.

In summer 2014, Basile switched Río Abajo for Chorillo.

Honors
Club
ANAPROF (2): 2007 (A), 2008 (A)

International career
Basile has made 3 appearances for Panama in 2005 two of them in FIFA World Cup qualification and one in a friendly against Bahrain.

References

External links
 

1980 births
Living people
People from Chitré
Association football forwards
Panamanian footballers
Panama international footballers
Sporting San Miguelito players
Huracán Buceo players
Unión Deportivo Universitario players
Cortuluá footballers
C.D. Árabe Unido players
C.D. Plaza Amador players
Chepo FC players
Once Municipal footballers
Panamanian expatriate footballers
Expatriate footballers in Uruguay
Expatriate footballers in Colombia
Expatriate footballers in El Salvador
Panamanian expatriate sportspeople in El Salvador
Panamanian expatriate sportspeople in Uruguay